2005 World Cup can refer to:

2005 Alpine Skiing World Cup
2005 Baseball World Cup
2005 Boxing World Cup
Chess World Cup 2005
2005 Women's Cricket World Cup
2005 Rugby World Cup Sevens
2005 ISSF World Cup
2005 Speedway World Cup

See also
 2005 Continental Championships (disambiguation)
 2005 World Championships (disambiguation)
 2005 World Junior Championships (disambiguation)